Oost-Watergraafsmeer was a stadsdeel (borough) of Amsterdam until 2010. It bordered Diemen, Duivendrecht, and the boroughs Amsterdam-Centrum, Oud-Zuid, Zeeburg, and Zuideramstel. The Watergraafsmeer part of the borough is a polder.

Located in Oost/Watergraafsmeer:
Oosterpark
Science Park Amsterdam
Buitenplaats Frankendael

External links
Official website

Former boroughs of Amsterdam
Amsterdam-Oost